Whitewater (formerly, White Water) is a census-designated place in Riverside County, California. It is directly off Interstate 10 halfway between North Palm Springs and Cabazon on the way from Palm Springs to Los Angeles. It is known as the site of the San Gorgonio Pass Wind Farm. The ZIP Code is 92282, and the community is inside area code 760. The population was 859 at the 2010 census.

Whitewater is famous for its recently renovated trout farm in the canyon of the Whitewater River.

History
Whitewater, still a populated place on the west bank of the Whitewater River, is located 10 miles (16 km) northwest of Palm Springs.  It began as rest and watering place for travelers on the Bradshaw Trail between San Bernardino and La Paz Arizona Territory in 1862. With the start of the Colorado River Gold Rush the trail was created to ship goods and allow people to cross the desert to the new boom towns on the Colorado River and the interior of Arizona Territory.  Whitewater got its name from the White Water Station, a stagecoach station that was located there on the Bradshaw Trail.  The settlement at White Water remained as a stop on the road into the Coachella Valley and to other desert regions to the east as it does today.

Geography 

Whitewater is located at  (33.924203 N, 116.644453 W) and is named for the nearby Whitewater River.  The wind farm is located near the I-10 exit at  (33.914456 N, 116.743897 W).  The area has nearly constant wind due to the venturi effect created by the San Bernardino Mountains to the north and the San Jacinto Mountains to the south, resulting in perfect conditions for the wind farm.

According to the United States Census Bureau, the CDP covers an area of 9.9 square miles (25.6 km), all of it land.

Climate
According to the Köppen Climate Classification system, Whitewater has a warm-summer Mediterranean climate, abbreviated "Csa" on climate maps.

Demographics
The 2010 United States Census reported that Whitewater had a population of 859. The racial makeup of Whitewater was 636 (74%) White, 37 (4%) African American, 31 (4%) Native American, 21 (2%) Asian, 0 (0%) Pacific Islander, 97 (11%) from other races, and 37 (4%) from two or more races. Hispanic or Latino of any race were 267 persons (31%).

The Census reported that 859 people (100% of the population) lived in households, 0 (0%) lived in non-institutionalized group quarters, and 0 (0%) were institutionalized.

There were 312 households, out of which 111 (36%) had children under the age of 18 living in them, 116 (37%) were opposite-sex married couples living together, 49 (16%) had a female householder with no husband present, 32 (10%) had a male householder with no wife present.  There were 35 (11%) unmarried opposite-sex partnerships, and 11 (4%) same-sex married couples or partnerships. 82 households (26%) were made up of individuals, and 26 (8%) had someone living alone who was 65 years of age or older. The average household size was 2.75.  There were 197 families (63% of all households); the average family size was 3.33.

The population was spread out, with 219 people (26%) under the age of 18, 74 people (9%) aged 18 to 24, 239 people (28%) aged 25 to 44, 242 people (28%) aged 45 to 64, and 85 people (10%) who were 65 years of age or older.  The median age was 37.3 years. For every 100 females, there were 108.0 males.  For every 100 females age 18 and over, there were 107.8 males.

The homeowner vacancy rate was 10%; the rental vacancy rate was 21%.  606 people (71% of the population) lived in owner-occupied housing units and 253 people (30%) lived in rental housing units.

Government
Federal:
In the United States Senate, California is represented by Democrats Dianne Feinstein and Alex Padilla.

State:

County:
In the Riverside County Board of Supervisors, Whitewater is in the Fifth District, represented by Libertarian Jeff Hewitt.
In the jurisdiction of the Riverside County Sheriff's Department, with Sheriff Chad Bianco.

References

External links

 
 

Census-designated places in Riverside County, California
Populated places in the Colorado Desert
Coachella Valley
Census-designated places in California
Bradshaw Trail
1862 establishments in California